

Historical and architectural interest bridges

Major bridges

Other bridges 
 Black Bridge, Bangkok
 Chaloem La 56 Bridge, Bangkok
 Chamai Maruchet Bridge, Bangkok
 Phan Phiphop Lila Bridge, Bangkok
 Phan Fa Lilat Bridge, Bangkok
 Mahatthai Utit Bridge, Bangkok
 Makkhawan Rangsan Bridge, Bangkok
 Thewakam Rang Rak Bridge, Bangkok
 Han Bridge, Bangkok
 Mon Bridge, Bangkok
 Hok Bridge, Bangkok
 Chang Rong Si Bridge, Bangkok
 Iron Bridge, Bangkok
 Orathai Bridge, Bangkok
 Nakhon Nontaburi Bridge, Nonthaburi
 Naowarat Bridge, Chiang Mai
 Mengrai Anusorn Bridge, Chiang Mai
 Iron Bridge, Chiang Mai
 Wanrat Bridge, Nakhonsawan
 Thep Suda Bridge, Kalasin
 Chom Klao Bridge, Phetchaburi
 Sarasin Bridge, Phang Nga and Phuket
 Phudhum Phabing Samakki Bridge, Loei
 Tinsulanonda Bridge, Songkhla
 Pridi-Thamrong Bridge, Ayutthaya
 Ratchadapisek Bridge, Lampang
 Nam Hueang Friendship Bridge
 Thai–Myanmar Friendship Bridge
 Sai River Bridge 
 Second Sai River Bridge
 Rantau Panjang–Sungai Golok Bridge
 Bukit Bunga–Ban Buketa Bridge

Notes and References 
 Notes

 

 Others references

See also 

 Transport in Thailand
 Rail transport in Thailand
 Thai highway network
 Controlled-access highways in Thailand
 List of railway bridges and viaducts in Thailand
 List of crossings of the Chao Phraya River
 List of crossings of the Mekong River
 Geography of Thailand

External links

Further reading 
 
 

Thailand
 
Bridges
Bridges